Olli Paavo Antero Kortekangas (born 16 May 1955) is a Finnish composer.

Kortekangas was born in Turku. His early career in music began at Espoon Musiikkiopisto (Espoo Music Institute) and the youth choir Candomino. He then studied at the Sibelius Academy as a pupil of Eero Hämeenniemi and Einojuhani Rautavaara from 1974 to 1981, and completed his studies in West Berlin with Dieter Schnebel from 1981 to 1982. Later he has held teaching positions at the Sibelius Academy and the National Theater Academy. He was Composer-in-Residence at Oulu Sinfonia from 1997 to 2007.

He has composed about 140 works covering a broad range, from choral works and instrumental miniatures to orchestral music and operas. He has received commissions from ten countries. Among his recent large-scale works are Seven Songs for Planet Earth, commissioned by the Choral Arts Society of Washington and the Tampere Philharmonic Orchestra, and Migrations for mezzo-soprano, male voice chorus and orchestra, commissioned by The Minnesota Orchestra and recorded by BIS Records. Kortekangas is particularly known for his choral music and operas, of which the latest are Messenius ja Lucia (2004), Daddy's Girl (2007), One Night Stand (2011) and Own Fault (2015). The latest opera is Veljeni vartija (My Brother's Keeper) to be premiered in February 2018 by the Tampere Opera. Kortekangas's work list also includes a number of chamber as well as instrumental solo works, particularly for organ.

Kortekangas has received a number of awards and recognitions, among them the Salzburg Opera Prize, the Special Prize of the Prix Italia Competition, and the prestigious Teosto Prize.

References

External links 
 
 Finnish Music Information Centre
 Fennica Gehrman (publisher)

1955 births
Living people
20th-century classical composers
Musicians from Turku
Finnish male classical composers
20th-century male musicians
20th-century Finnish composers